Anthony Brookby (Brorbey) (executed 19 July 1537) was an English Franciscan theologian. He offended Henry VIII, and became a Catholic martyr.	

Brookby was a lecturer in theology at Magdalen College, Oxford. He was versed in Greek and Hebrew, and enjoyed a reputation as an eloquent preacher. In a sermon of Brookby's, he attacked the king's actions and mode of living.

He was arrested, put to the rack, and tortured in order to make him retract what he had said. Disabled as a result of his tortures, Brookby was cared for by a pious woman for a fortnight. By the command of the king, an executioner strangled him to death, with the Franciscan cord which he wore around his waist.

The year of his death has been questioned, with the Victoria County History for Kent placing the event in 1534.

Notes

References
Mary Jean Stone, Faithful unto Death (London, 1892), iv, 76;
Anthony Parkinson, Coll. Anglo-Minor. (London, 1726), 239;
Thaddeus, The Franciscans in England (London, 1898), III, 17;
Danielle, Martirio e Morte d'alcuni Frati di San Francesco, III, 16.

Attribution

Year of birth unknown
1537 deaths
16th-century English educators
People associated with Magdalen College, Oxford
Academics of the University of Oxford
English Franciscans
English Roman Catholics
16th-century English Roman Catholic theologians
English torture victims
People executed under Henry VIII
Executed English people
People executed by ligature strangulation
Venerable martyrs of England and Wales